Catharina Johanna Elise (Nine) Kooiman (born 9 December 1980 in De Meern, Utrecht) is a Dutch politician and former social worker. As a member of the Socialist Party (Socialistische Partij) she has been an MP from 17 June 2010 until 29 March 2018. She focused on matters of youth and family law.

From 2007 to 2010 she was a member of the municipal council of Nieuwegein.

Kooiman studied social work and public services at the Hogeschool De Horst in Driebergen.

References 
  Parlement.com biography

External links 

  House of Representatives biography

1980 births
Living people
Dutch social workers
Members of the House of Representatives (Netherlands)
Municipal councillors in Utrecht (province)
People from Nieuwegein
People from Vleuten-De Meern
Socialist Party (Netherlands) politicians
21st-century Dutch politicians
21st-century Dutch women politicians